The voiceless nasal glottal approximant is a type of consonantal sound, a nasal approximant, used in some oral languages.

Occurrence 
The h sound is nasalized in several languages, apparently due to a connection between glottal and nasal sounds called rhinoglottophilia. Examples of languages where the only h-like sound is nasalized are Krim, Lisu, and Pirahã.

More rarely, a language will contrast oral  and nasal . Two such languages are neighboring Bantu languages of Angola and Namibia, Kwangali and Mbukushu. In these languages, vowels following  are nasalized, though nasal vowels do not occur elsewhere. A distinction is also reported from Wolaytta, though in that case the nasal is rare.

Notes

References

External links
 

Approximant-fricative consonants
Glottal consonants
Nasal consonants
Pulmonic consonants